Vasile Gafencu (1 February 1886 – 16 March 1942) was a Bessarabian politician.

He was the father of Valeriu Gafencu (1921–1952), nicknamed The Saint of Prisons.

Biography 
He served as Member of the Moldovan Parliament (1917–1918).
After the Soviet occupation of Bessarabia and northern Bukovina in 1940, Gafencu was deported to Siberia by the Soviet authorities.

Gallery

Bibliography 
 Gheorghe E. Cojocaru, Sfatul Țării: itinerar, Civitas, Chişinău, 1998,  
 Mihai Taşcă, Sfatul Țării şi actualele autorităţi locale, "Timpul de dimineaţă", no. 114 (849), June 27, 2008 (page 16)

Notes

External links 
 Arhiva pentru Sfatul Tarii 
 Deputaţii Sfatului Ţării şi Lavrenti Beria

1886 births
1942 deaths
Romanian people of Moldovan descent
People from Sîngerei District
Moldovan MPs 1917–1918